Stéphan Armand Lebeau (born February 28, 1968) is a former professional ice hockey centre who played seven seasons in the National Hockey League from 1988–89 to 1994–95. He won a Stanley Cup in 1993 with the Montreal Canadiens. His brother, Patrick, also played a short time in the NHL.

Playing career
Lebeau was a scoring sensation in junior with the Shawinigan Cataractes of the Quebec Major Junior Hockey League, and in 1987–88 he led the QMJHL in goals scored with 94. He finished his junior career second all-time in QMJHL career goals with 281, behind Mike Bossy, and second all-time in career points with 580, behind only Shawinigan-teammate Patrice Lefebvre.

Lebeau continued his scoring prowess in the American Hockey League after being signed by the Montreal Canadiens in 1986. He played one season in the AHL with the Sherbrooke Canadiens and led the league with 70 goals and 134 points as a rookie, which garnered him three major awards, including the Dudley "Red" Garrett Memorial Award as the league's top rookie. Lebeau's 70 goals still stands as the AHL single season record. The next season, he moved up to the NHL full-time, and scored 15 goals and 35 points in his rookie season. Over the next three seasons Lebeau's point total steadily improved, climaxing with 80 points in the 1992–93 season, the same year the Canadiens came away with the Stanley Cup.

However the next season he failed to produce at the same clip, and midway through was traded to the Mighty Ducks of Anaheim for goalie Ron Tugnutt. He would play in Anaheim until 1994–95, and then he moved on to play in Switzerland before retiring in 2001. He currently resides in Sherbrooke, Quebec and runs the hockey program at Bishop's College School in Lennoxville. In 2015, he started to coach the Cougars of Champlain College Lennoxville. He has a son named Jeffrey and a distant cousin, Nicolas, who is a rugby player at Bishop’s University.

Awards
QMJHL Second All-Star Team (1987, 1988)
AHL First All-Star Team (1989)
Dudley "Red Garrett Memorial Award (1989)
John B. Sollenberger Trophy (Leading Scorer in the AHL) (1989)
Les Cunningham Award (AHL MVP) (1989)

Career statistics

References

External links

1968 births
Canadian ice hockey centres
French Quebecers
HC Ambrì-Piotta players
HC La Chaux-de-Fonds players
HC Lugano players
Ice hockey people from Quebec
Living people
Mighty Ducks of Anaheim players
Montreal Canadiens players
People from Saint-Jérôme
Shawinigan Cataractes players
Sherbrooke Canadiens players
Bishop's College School Faculty
Stanley Cup champions
Undrafted National Hockey League players
Victoriaville Tigres coaches
Canadian expatriate ice hockey players in Switzerland
Canadian ice hockey coaches